This is a list of Panchen Lamas of Tibet. There are currently 10 recognised incarnations of the Panchen Lama; the 11th Panchen Lama is disputed however.

List

11th Panchen Lama schism

After the death of the 10th Panchen Lama, his succession came to be disputed between the exiled 14th Dalai Lama and the government of the People's Republic of China. This resulted in a schism between two competing candidates are claimed to be the 11th Panchen Lama.

See also
 List of Dalai Lamas
 List of rulers of Tibet

References

History of Tibet
Panchen Lamas
Tibet